Fahsien can refer to:
Fahsien, a historic Chinese Buddhist monk
Fahsien, a historic Chinese county which is now the Huadu District of Guangzhou City, Guangdong Province, China
Fahsien, the alternative name of a historic Chinese county which is now Huazhou City, Guangdong Province, China